Băicoi is a town in Prahova County, Romania, near the 45th parallel. Five localities are administered by the town: Dâmbu, Liliești, Schela, Tufeni, and Țintea. Over time, these have become neighborhoods of the town. 

Bӑicoi is located in the historical region of Muntenia. The town is crossed on its southwestern side by the national road DN1, which connects it to the county seat, Ploiești,   to the southeast and Brașov,  to the north. Bӑicoi lies near Florești, a train stop between Ploiești and Câmpina.

History

The name of the town is derived from "Baicu". At the end of the 19th century, Băicoi was a rural commune, formed by the villages of Băicoi, Cotoiu, Tufeni, and Găgeni, totaling 3,257 inhabitants. The other localities of the current town made up the Țintea commune, which consisted of Țintea, Dâmbu, and Liliești villages, totaling 1,240 inhabitants. Both communes were part of Plasa Filipești, in Prahova County. By 1925, Băicoi commune had 5,946 inhabitants, in Băicoi, Cotoiu, and Tufeni villages (Găgeni village having been assigned to Păulești commune); Țintea commune, in the same composition, had 2,639 inhabitants. 

Băicoi commune was declared a town in 1948, at the beginning of the Romanian People's Republic. When the regions were abolished in 1968, Țintea commune with all its villages was assigned to the town of Băicoi, which became part of Prahova County.

Natives
 Adina-Ioana Vălean (born 1968), politician

Climate
Băicoi has a humid continental climate (Cfb in the Köppen climate classification).

Notes

External links 

 Official site

Towns in Romania
Populated places in Prahova County
Localities in Muntenia